Rearguard Falls Provincial Park is a provincial park in British Columbia, Canada, protecting Rearguard Falls on the Fraser River. It is located just above its emergence into the Rocky Mountain Trench near the community of Tete Jaune Cache.  The park is easily accessed via BC Highway 16. Rearguard Falls is one of only two waterfalls on the -long Fraser River; the other is a few kilometres upstream at Overlander Falls. Rearguard Falls offers a view of the return of Chinook salmon for spawning.

References

Regional District of Fraser-Fort George
Provincial parks of British Columbia
Robson Valley
Fraser River
1991 establishments in British Columbia
Protected areas established in 1991